Abby Hagyard is a Canadian television actress, voice artist, and comedian, best known for her appearances on Nickelodeon's sketch comedy television series You Can't Do That on Television, and her voice work on animated adaptations of The Care Bears and For Better or For Worse.

Background
Born in Edmonton, Alberta and of Norwegian descent, Hagyard's interest in acting began when she was enrolled in a modeling class with her mother. She modeled for two years and then had a secretarial position in the New York offices of Playboy. She returned to Ottawa, Ontario, and studied drama at St. Patrick's College (now Carleton University) for 3 years. She began her work in entertainment as a high-fashion model on Miami Beach and actress. In the early 1980s, she toured the eastern seaboard performing in small venues, and then began hosting the CBC television show Scene from Here, while continuing to perform sketch comedy.

Career
Referred to by the Ottawa Citizen as "one of our town's best and busiest actresses", Starring roles in dinner theater productions led to a one-woman show and an invitation to host her own entertainment series on CBC. In 1982, Hagyard joined the cast of You Can't Do That on Television as one of only two adult actors along with Les Lye, and both were mainstays on the program among its rotating juvenile cast until its end in 1990.

Between taping sessions, Hagyard provided character voices for the animated cartoon series For Better or For Worse, The Adventures of Teddy Ruxpin, Dennis the Menace and The Care Bears. She additionally co-hosted a morning drive radio show.

Hagyard also has a boutique publishing service, AH Publisher.

Filmography
As actor
 You Can't Do That on Television (113 episodes, 1982–1990)
As voice artist
 The Care Bears in the Land Without Feelings (1983) – Friend Bear, Love-A-Lot Bear, Wish Bear
 The Care Bears Battle the Freeze Machine (1984) – Friend Bear, Love-A-Lot Bear, Wish Bear
 For Better or for Worse: The Bestest Present (1985)
 The Adventures of Teddy Ruxpin (7 episodes, 1986-1987)
 Care Bears (1 episode, 1988)
 Dennis the Menace (1986) - Additional Voices (Season 2)
 For Better or for Worse: The Last Camping Trip (1992)
 For Better or for Worse: A Christmas Angel (1992)
 For Better or for Worse: A Valentine from the Heart (1993)
 For Better or for Worse: The Good-for-Nothing (1993)
 For Better or for Worse: The Babe Magnet (1994)
 For Better or for Worse: A Storm in April (1997)
 For Better or for Worse (1 episode, 2000)

Recognition

Awards and nominations
 1983, ACTRA Award for 'Best Female On-Camera Performance'
 1983, ACTRA Award for 'Best Voice-Over/Narration'

References

External links

Living people
Actresses from Edmonton
Canadian voice actresses
Canadian women dramatists and playwrights
Canadian television actresses
Writers from Edmonton
20th-century Canadian dramatists and playwrights
20th-century Canadian women writers
Year of birth missing (living people)